These are the official results of the Women's 100 metres hurdles event at the 2003 IAAF World Championships in Paris, France. There were a total number of 39 participating athletes, with five qualifying heats, three semi-finals and the final held on Wednesday August 27, 2003 at 19:25h.

Summary
In the third heat of the semi finals, Patricia Girard and Vonette Dixon had a rare, unbreakable tie for the second qualifying spot.  Since the Paris track could accommodate 9 runners, this was a rare case where 9 were advanced to the finals.

Running before a home crowd, Girard was marginally first over the first hurdle of the final.  She extended the lead over the second hurdle, but by the third, the field had come back.  Jenny Adams and Perdita Felicien emerged with the lead.  By the fifth hurdle, Felicien was all alone.  Glory Alozie, Miesha McKelvy and Brigitte Foster-Hylton had joined Adams in the hunt for silver.  By the seventh hurdle, Felicien had a 1 metre lead over McKelvy, slightly ahead of Foster-Hylton.  Through the next couple of hurdles, Foster-Hylton got up a head of steam, passing McKelvy and pulling in some of Felicien's lead.  Diving for the line early, Foster-Hylton got as close as a foot (30 cm) a couple of metres before the finish, but she was losing balance.  Felicien crossed the finish maintaining her speed while Foster-Hylton struggled her last two steps, crashing to the track after the finish.  More than a metre back, McKelvy took bronze, still half a metre ahead of Alozie.

Medalists

Final

Semi-final
Held on Tuesday 2003-08-26

Heats
Held on Monday 2003-08-25

See also
Athletics at the 2003 Pan American Games - Women's 100 metres hurdles

References
 IAAF
 YouTube

H
Sprint hurdles at the World Athletics Championships
2003 in women's athletics